Albinus is a name.

Notable people known as Albinus include:

People with the mononym
 Albinus (philosopher), Greek philosopher
 Albinus (abbot), abbot of St. Peter's, Canterbury
 Alcuin of York, a Northumbrian scholar, nicknamed Albinus
 St. Albinus of Angers (Aubin, Albin), bishop
 Albinus of Provence, Merovingian duke and bishop
 Witta of Büraburg, also known as Albinus
 Albin of Brechin, Scottish bishop
 Albinus, cardinal-bishop of Albano from 1189 to 1206

Romans
 Lucceius Albinus, Roman governor of Judaea, 62–64 AD
 Clodius Albinus, Roman imperial pretender in the 2nd century
 Decimus Junius Brutus Albinus, assassin of Julius Caesar
 Caecina Decius Albinus, urban prefect of Rome in 402
 Caecina Decius Aginatius Albinus, son of Caecina Decius Albinus and urban prefect of Rome in 414
 Albinus (consul 444)
 Albinus (consul 493)

People with the surname
 Bernhardus Albinus, German physician (1653-1721)
 Bernhard Siegfried Albinus, German-born Dutch physician (1697-1770)
 Christiaan Bernhard Albinus (c. 1698–1752), German-Dutch anatomist
 Frederik Bernard Albinus (1715–1778), Dutch anatomist

 Jens Albinus (born 1965), Danish actor

See also